The 2003 Irish Greyhound Derby took place during August and September with the final being held at Shelbourne Park in Dublin on 20 September 2003. 

The winner Climate Control won €150,000 and was trained by Seamus Graham, owned by Kevin Smith & Aidan O'Regan and bred by Ailish and Aisling McCann. The race was sponsored by the Paddy Power.

Final result 
At Shelbourne, 20 September (over 550 yards):

Distances 
1¾, neck, 1¼, short-head, ¾ (lengths)

Competition Report
Climate Control led the ante-post betting for the 2002 Irish Derby. The blue dog had won the Consolation Stakes the previous year and had maintained good form since, even recovering from a hock injury at one stage. Serene Rumble was next in the ante-post list with World Class just behind.

Owen McKenna's Droopys Oasis was the first to impress in round one recording 29.74 and in round two Borna Pilot went even faster setting the best time so far (29.59). World Class was the first major name to eliminated before round three.

After the completion of round three there were six unbeaten greyhounds, they were Droopys Oasis, Droopys Agassi, Climate Control, Serene Rumble, Bookie Burglar and Maryville Rumble but Serene Rumble was withdrawn injured from the competition.

Only Droopys Agassi and Bookie Burglar remained unbeaten after the quarter-finals with the two remaining heats going to Kings Cadet and Mustang Mega. The first semifinal saw Kings Cadet break a hock when prominent and despite hampering Climate Control the latter won from the dead heating second place pair of First Charter and Maryville Rumble. Droopys Joel provided a shock result in the second heat after taking advantage of Droopys Agassi and Bookie Burglar bumping into each other, both were eliminated. Mustang Mega and La Fontaine sealed the final two places.

Climate Control took control of the final with a turn of early pace that saw him pull clear of the challenging First Charter and Mustang Mega. Climate Control won from Mustang Mega and the strong finishing Maryville Rumble talking third. The presentation was conducted by the Irish president Mary McAleese.

Quarter-finals

Semifinals

+dead-heat

See also
2003 UK & Ireland Greyhound Racing Year

References

Greyhound Derby
Irish Greyhound Derby
Irish Greyhound Derby